Liberty is the name of some places in the U.S. state of Pennsylvania:

Liberty, Allegheny County, Pennsylvania
Liberty, Tioga County, Pennsylvania
Liberty Mountain Resort, a ski area located in Carroll Valley, Pennsylvania

See also
Liberty Township, Pennsylvania (disambiguation)

it:Liberty (disambigua)#Toponimi
nl:Liberty (Pennsylvania)